Freddy dos Santos (born 2 October 1976 in Oslo) is a Norwegian former footballer who played most of his career for Vålerenga in the Norwegian Premier League.

Dos Santos has played as a defender, midfield and forward. His former clubs are Skeid and Molde.

Club career

Skeid
He started his career at Skeid. During the last two seasons with them he played in the Norwegian top division.

Molde
In 1998 season, he moved to Molde after Skeid got relegated from the top flight. In his first two seasons he helped them in achieving a back-to-back silver medal in the league, also playing in the group stages of the 1999–2000 Champions League.

Vålerenga
He moved back to Oslo in 2001 and joined Vålerenga, who had just been relegated from the Norwegian Premier League. He helped them secure direct promotion. He started in both finals in which Vålerenga won the Norwegian Football Cup, in 2002 and 2008. In 2005, he won the Norwegian Premier League with Vålerenga.

He has played over 300 games for Vålerenga, more than any other player in the history of the club.

International career
He has played several games at various youth levels for Norway, but never played in the senior side. He could potentially feature for Cape Verde as his father is born there.

Personal life
Cape Verde is his father's country of origin.

In July 2006, dos Santos launched a single, This Is For Real, together with four other professional Norwegian footballers – Morten Gamst Pedersen, Raymond Kvisvik, Kristofer Hæstad and Øyvind Svenning. They called their band The Players.

In 2012, dos Santos was announced as the host of the Norwegian version of The Amazing Race.

Club statistics
Correct as of match played 31 October 2010

 2003: 2 relegation games (0 goals) included in league games
 2009: 1 Super Final (0 goals) added to Cup games

Honours
Vålerenga
Tippeligaen: 2005
Norwegian Football Cup: 2002, 2008

References

1976 births
Living people
Footballers from Oslo
Norwegian footballers
Norway under-21 international footballers
Norway youth international footballers
Association football defenders
Association football midfielders
Skeid Fotball players
Molde FK players
Vålerenga Fotball players
Norwegian First Division players
Eliteserien players
Norwegian people of Cape Verdean descent